Ramzi Boukhiam (born 14 September 1993 in Agadir) is a Moroccan surfer. He placed 6th overall at the 2019 ISA World Surfing Games, earning qualification for the 2020 Summer Olympics as the highest-placed African surfer. He competed in the men's shortboard event at the Olympics, where he was eliminated in the third round by Michel Bourez of France. 

In 2022, he became the first Moroccan to qualify for the World Surf League's (WSL) Championship Tour (CT).

Biography 
Boukhiam was born in Morocco to a Moroccan father and a Dutch mother. In his junior career, Boukhiam was twice a medallist at the World Junior Championships, including finishing as runner-up to Gabriel Medina in 2013.

References

Moroccan surfers
Living people
1993 births
Surfers at the 2020 Summer Olympics
Olympic surfers of Morocco
World Surf League surfers
People from Agadir

Shilha people
Dutch people of Moroccan descent
Moroccan people of Dutch descent